A Beatle boot or Baba boot  is a style of boot that has been worn since the late 1950s but made popular by the English rock group the Beatles in the 1960s. The boots are a variant of the Chelsea boot: they are tight-fitting, Cuban-heeled, ankle-high boots with a sharp pointed toe. The style can feature either elastic or zipped sides.

Beatle boots saw the reintroduction of high-heeled footwear for men.

History 

Beatle boots are a direct descendant of the Chelsea boot, but have an even more pointed toe and a centre seam stitch running from ankle to toe, and the flamenco boot, from which its Cuban heel was derived. Beatle boots originated in 1958, but in October 1961 when English musicians John Lennon, George Harrison and Paul McCartney saw Chelsea boots whilst in Hamburg, being worn by a London band, and then went to the London footwear company Anello & Davide to commission four pairs (with the addition of Cuban heels) for the Beatles, to complement their new suit image upon their return from Hamburg.

Beatle boots were very popular with rock bands and artists during the late 1950s, but started to decline during the late 1960s. They were worn by subcultures such as teddy boys, beatniks, rockers and psyches etc. The boots saw a surge of popularity during the punk movement in the late 1970s and early 1980s but again started to decline throughout the 1990s. During the late 2000s and early 2010s the boots have seen a steady surge in popularity.

Notable wearers

Non-fictional

The Beatles
Carl Barât
Michael Jackson 
Jonny Ivey
Justin McGehee
The Dave Clark Five
The Monkees
Elvis Presley
Johnny Cash
Chuck Berry
Little Richard
Bill Haley
Eddie Cochran
The Who
James Brown
Roy Orbison
Jimi Hendrix
Alice Cooper
Claude François
Neil Tennant
The Doors
MC5
The Velvet Underground
The Grateful Dead
The Kinks
The Zombies
The Sonics
The Yardbirds
The Byrds
The Beach Boys
Steve Lukather
Ryan Ross
Daedalus Howell
Iggy Pop
David Bowie
KISS
Queen
Jef Aerosol
Marc Zermati
The Pretty Things
Peter Gunn of The Inmates
The Kills
Russell Brand
Bob Dylan
The Gruesomes
The Rolling Stones
Alex Turner
Richey Edwards
Andy Warhol
Kanye West

Fictional
 Riff Raff from the 1975 film The Rocky Horror Picture Show
 Austin Powers, from the Austin Powers series
 Ned Flanders, from The Simpsons
Sid from Hey Arnold!
Starfleet officers in Star Trek: The Original Series
Eddie Dean from Stephen King's The Dark Tower series.

References

External links
Chelsea Boot/beatle Boot: The Origin, The Story & The Legacy
John Lennon's Beatle Boot, at Google Arts & Culture

Boots
1960s fashion
1970s fashion
Boots
High-heeled footwear